Sereda (Cyrillic: Середа) is a gender-neutral Slavic surname which means Wednesday. Notable people with the surname include:
Aleksandr Sereda (born 1983), Russian professional association football player
Alexey Sereda (born 1966), Russian professional association football coach and a former player
Anton Sereda (born 1980), Russian professional association football player
David Sereda (born 1957), Canadian musician
Liubov Sereda (born 1945), Soviet rhythmic gymnast
Oleksiy Sereda (born 2005), Ukrainian diver
Semyon Sereda (1871–1933), Soviet politician
Valeriy Sereda (born 1959), retired high jumper

See also

References

East Slavic-language surnames